Brittany Reimer (born January 3, 1988) is a Canadian former freestyle swimmer.  She is a two-time medallist at the World Championships and swam at the 2004 Summer Olympics.

Career

Reimer competed at the 2004 Summer Olympics in the 200, 400, and 800-metre freestyle.  Reimer also competed in the 4×100-metre medley relay.

At the 2005 World Aquatics Championships, Reimer won silver in the 800-metre freestyle and bronze in the 1500-metre freestyle.  She placed fourth in the women's 400-metre freestyle and broke three Canadian records at this competition.

At the Commonwealth Games in 2006, Reimer won a bronze medal in the women's 800-metre freestyle.

Brittany Reimer is now working as a realtor at MLA Canada Realty in Surrey, British Columbia.

See also
 List of World Aquatics Championships medalists in swimming (women)
 List of Commonwealth Games medallists in swimming (women)

References

External links
 
 

1988 births
Living people
Canadian female freestyle swimmers
Commonwealth Games bronze medallists for Canada
Commonwealth Games medallists in swimming
Olympic swimmers of Canada
Swimmers from Victoria, British Columbia
Swimmers at the 2004 Summer Olympics
World Aquatics Championships medalists in swimming
Swimmers at the 2006 Commonwealth Games
Medallists at the 2006 Commonwealth Games